CORONAMOOD is a nonprofit that researches mood during the COVID-19 pandemic. The organization has reached over 5,000 respondents in more than 150 countries using a dichotomous question type survey where anonymous data is collected and donated to private research. CORONAMOOD is involved in research proving that external sociopolitical external events influence the way humans behave.

References

International non-profit organizations
Organizations established in 2020